Ef or Fe (Ф ф; italics: Ф ф) is a Cyrillic letter, commonly representing the voiceless labiodental fricative , like the pronunciation of  in "fill, flee, or fall".

History
The Cyrillic letter Ef was derived from the Greek letter Phi (Φ φ). It merged with and eliminated letter Fita (Ѳ) in the Russian alphabet in 1918.

In the Cyrillic numeral system, Ef has a value of 500.

Appearance
The Slavic languages have almost no native words containing . This sound did not exist in Proto-Indo-European (PIE). It arose in Greek and Latin from PIE  (which yielded Slavic ). In some instances in Latin, it represented historical th-fronting and derived from Proto-Indo-European . In the Germanic languages, the f sound arose from PIE , which remained unchanged in Slavic. The letter ф is thus almost exclusively found in words of foreign origin, especially Greek (from φ and sometimes from θ), Latin, French, German, Dutch, English, and Turkic.

Example borrowings in Russian:
 from Greek: катастрофа, "catastrophe" (from φ); Фёдор, "Theodore" (from θ)
 from Latin: федерация, "federation"; эффект, "effect"
 from German: картофель, "potato" (from Kartoffel); фунт, "pound" (from Pfund)
 from Dutch: флаг, "flag"

The few native Slavic words with this letter (in different languages) are examples of onomatopoeia (like Russian verbs фукать, фыркать etc.) or reflect sporadic pronunciation shifts:
 from пв : Serbian уфати 'to hope' (cf. Church Slavonic уповати 'to hope')
 from хв : Macedonian сфати '(he) understands' (cf. Church Slavonic схватити 'to take, to catch'), Russian дрофа 'bustard' (cf. Ukrainian дрохва 'bustard')
 from кв : Russian филин 'eagle-owl' (cf Ukrainian квилити 'to cry')
 from х : Russian toponym Фили 'Fili' (from хилый 'sickly')

Slavic languages
Ef is the 21st letter of the Bulgarian alphabet; the 22nd letter of the Russian alphabet; the 23rd letter of the Belarusian alphabet; the 25th letter of the Serbian and Ukrainian alphabet; and the 26th letter of the Macedonian alphabet. It represents the consonant  unless it is before a palatalizing vowel, when it represents .

Related letters and other similar characters
Φ φ/ϕ : Greek letter Phi
Ѳ ѳ : Cyrillic letter Fita
F f : Latin letter F
Փ :  Armenian letter Piwr
Q q Latin letter Q

Computing codes

External links

References